Ulrich V of Württemberg called "der Vielgeliebte" (the much loved) (1413 – 1 September 1480, in Leonberg), Count of Württemberg. He was the younger son of Count Eberhard IV and Henriette of Mömpelgard.

Life
After the early death of his father, his mother,  together with the Württembergian councils, took over the guardianship for Ulrich and his older brother Ludwig I. Ludwig reached maturity in 1426 and took rule in his own hands, until his brother Ulrich in 1433 was admitted to co-rule. After some years of common government Ulrich wed Margaret of Cleves and put through the division of the county. This was confirmed 23 April 1441. Ulrich received the eastern and northern parts with the capital in Stuttgart. Ludwig the western and southern land part with the capital in Urach, as well as the territories in Alsace . The division which had been limited originally on four years was made permanent on 25 January 1442 by the Treaty of Nürtingen.

In 1444 Ulrich supported the house of Habsburg under King Friedrich III in the Old Zürich War in the fight against the Old Swiss Confederacy. Together with his allies which were margrave Albrecht Achilles of Brandenburg, the archbishop of Mainz Dietrich Schenk of Erbach as well as margrave Jakob I of Baden he formed the core of the Mergentheimer alliance which went advanced more and more against the imperial towns. These tensions found their culmination in the feud between margrave Albrecht and the imperial town of Nuremberg in 1449. Count Ulrich's main opponent under the imperial towns was Esslingen which reduced the income of the county Württemberg by rising it's his duties clearly. However, Ulrich did not succeed in winning a determining advantage in spite of winning multiple victories against Esslingen and other imperial towns.

In 1450 Ulrich gained, after the death of his brother Ludwig I, the guardianship on his nephews, the future counts of Württemberg-Urach Ludwig II and Eberhard V. This soon led to a quarrel with Frederick I, Elector Palatine, who likewise asserted claim to the guardianship. Ludwig II already died 1457. The estates of Urach passed to Count Eberhard V in 1459.

In 1458 Ulrich destroyed the castle of Widdern. This increased the tensions between him and Frederick. Two alliance blocs had developed in the German Empire. Ulrich joined the group of Frederick III, crowned emperor in 1452, and Margrave Albrecht Achilles of Brandenburg. Their main opponents were the brother of the imperial duke Albert VI of Austria, Frederick of the Palatinate and Duke Louis IX of Bavaria. In 1460 the first military encounters between the two groups occurred. After a short armistice, Frederick III once more proclaimed imperial war against Bavaria the following year. Together with Albrecht Achilles, Ulrich assumed leadership of the imperial forces against Bavaria. In the Mainz Diocesan Feud of 1461 to 1463, which broke out shortly after, he supported Archbishop Adolf II of Nassau against his deposed predecessor Diether von Isenburg and Frederick I of the Palatinate. After skirmishes, on 30 June 1462 a battle took place near Seckenheim, and Ulrich and his allies were defeated. They were taken captive by the Palatinate forces. Only on 27 April 1463 was Ulrich able to return to Stuttgart after payment of a ransom.

In 1473 went Ulrich and Eberhard V a house contract one which should regulate the common hereditary result and aspire to the reunion of both württembergian land parts. Ulrich received later with Eberhard V also support against his own renitenten son, Eberhard VI, by which Eberhard V also influence in the Stuttgart land part won.

Family and children
He was married three times:
First, he married in Stuttgart 29 January 1441 to Margaret of Cleves, daughter of Duke Adolf I of Cleves and Mary of Burgundy. They had one daughter:
 Katharina (7 December 1441 – 28 June 1497, Würzburg), a nun in Laufen.

Second, he married in Stuttgart 8 February 1445 to Elisabeth of Bavaria-Landshut, daughter of Henry XVI of Bavaria and Margarete of Austria. They had five children:
 Margareta (ca. 1446 – 21 July 1479, Worms), a nun in Liebenau monastery.
 Duke Eberhard II (1 February 1447, Waiblingen – 17 February 1504, Castle Lindenfels, Odenwald).
 Henry (7 September 1448 – 15 April 1519), Count of Montbéliard.
 Ulrich (ca. 1449 – died young).
 Elisabeth (23 December 1450, Landshut – 6 April 1501), married in Münnerstadt 13 September 1469 to Count Friedrich II of Henneberg.

Third, he married in Stuttgart 11 November 1453 to Margaret of Savoy, daughter of Duke Amadeus VIII of Savoy and Mary of Burgundy. They had three daughters:
 Margarete (ca. 1454 – 21 April 1470), married 23 April 1469 to Count Philipp I of Eppstein-Königstein.
 Philippine (ca. 1456 – 4 June 1475, Weert), married 22 April/4 June 1470 to Count Jakob II of Horn.
 Helene (ca. 1460 – 19 February 1506), married in Waldenburg 26 February 1476 to Count Kraft VI of Hohenlohe-Neuenstein.

He also had numerous illegitimate children.

Ancestors

Notes

References
Eugen Schneider: Ulrich V., Graf von Württemberg. [In:] Allgemeine Deutsche Biographie (ADB). vol. 39, Duncker & Humblot, Leipzig 1895, pp. 235–237.
Thomas Fritz: Ulrich V. der Vielgeliebte. [In:] Sönke Lorenz, Dieter Mertens, Volker Press (Hrsg.): Das Haus Württemberg. Ein biographisches Lexikon., Kohlhammer Verlag, Stuttgart 1997, pp. 86–89.
Thomas Fritz: Ulrich der Vielgeliebte (1441–1480)., Leinfelden-Echterdingen 1999.

1413 births
1480 deaths
15th-century counts of Württemberg
Medieval child monarchs